Dissay is a commune in the Vienne department in the Nouvelle-Aquitaine region in western France. The main landmark is the castle, built in the 15th century by Pierre d'Amboise, bishop of Poitiers.

History
Human settlement in the territory of Dissay dates back millennia: a single grave in Poitou-Charentes dates back to 4300 BC. Gallo-Roman houses spring up along the Roman road that links Saintes to Poitiers Tours. The territory of Dissay is arranged like an axis, with this road as one of the lines. Tradition maintains the "Roman road" as a recurring term for that road.

Population

Economy
Dissay is located between Poitiers and Châtellerault. As of 2019, its labor force is of 1,617 active workers (activity rate: 79.9%). More than 80 merchants, artisans, industries and services are currently located in the town center and the two parks of the town.

Twin towns
 Madone, Italy

See also
Communes of the Vienne department

References

Communes of Vienne
Vienne communes articles needing translation from French Wikipedia